Elbeyli   is a village in Erdemli district of Mersin Province, Turkey. At  it is  inj the forests of Toros Mountains. The population of Elbeyli  was 504   as of 2012. The village was founded in 1800s by Turkmen people. The main economic activity of the village is farming. Tomato, cucumber and beans are produced.

References

Villages in Erdemli District